Don Cheadle is an American actor and producer that has appeared in numerous films and television series since the early 1980s. He has appeared in the films Devil in a Blue Dress (1995), Rebound: The Legend of Earl "The Goat" Manigault as Earl Manigault (1996), Volcano (1997) and Boogie Nights (1997). He won a Golden Globe Award for Best Supporting Actor – Series, Miniseries or Television Film for his portrayal of Sammy Davis Jr. in the 1998 film The Rat Pack.

In 2001, he was cast as Basher Tarr in the first installment of the Ocean's film series. He went on to reprise the role in the 2004 sequel and the 2007 final film of the trilogy. During that time, he starred in the 2004 drama film Hotel Rwanda as Paul Rusesabagina which earned him Best Actor nominations for an Academy Award, Golden Globe and Screen Actors Guild Award. The same year, he was a part of the ensemble cast in the film Crash alongside Sandra Bullock and Matt Dillon.

In 2010, he replaced Terrence Howard in the role of James Rhodes / War Machine in the Marvel Studios film Iron Man 2. He later reprised the role in Iron Man 3 (2013), Avengers: Age of Ultron (2015), Captain America: Civil War (2016), Avengers: Infinity War (2018), Captain Marvel (2019), Avengers: Endgame (2019), and the Disney+ series The Falcon and the Winter Soldier (2021) and What If…? (2021).

His television work includes appearances in Night Court (1988), The Fresh Prince of Bel-Air (1990), The Golden Palace (1992-1993), Picket Fences (1993–1995), The Bernie Mac Show (2002), ER (2002), and as Marty Kaan in House of Lies (2012–2016).

Film

Television

Theatre

Video games

Music videos

References

External links 
 
 Don Cheadle at the Rotten Tomatoes

American filmographies
Male actor filmographies